Jasmin Kurtić (born 10 January 1989) is a Slovenian professional footballer who plays as a midfielder for Super League Greece club PAOK, on loan from Parma, and the Slovenia national team.

Club career

Early career 
A right-footed midfielder, Kurtić joined the 1. SNL club Gorica in August 2010 from the 2. SNL club Bela Krajina.

His stint at Gorica lasted only six months, as he was noted by scouts of Serie A club Palermo; on 18 December 2010 it was announced Kurtić had agreed a four-and-a-half-year contract with the Sicilians, effective from January 2011, thus making him the fourth Slovenian to join the club during the 2010–11 season.

On 12 January 2011, Kurtić made his Palermo debut in the Coppa Italia round of 16 game against Chievo; the match ended in a 1–0 win for Palermo.
On 13 February 2011, Kurtić made his debut in Serie A, playing the whole 90 minutes against Fiorentina. On 10 April 2011, Kurtić scored his first goal in Serie A for Palermo against Cesena.

On 1 August 2011, he moved on loan to Varese in Serie B, with an option for his new club to acquire 50% of his transfer rights by the end of the season. He debuted for the team in Serie B on 27 August against Bari. For the 2012–13 season he returned to Palermo.

Sassuolo 
On 1 July 2013, Kurtić moved to Sassuolo in a co-ownership deal. He made his Sassuolo debut in the third round of Coppa Italia away to Novara on 17 August 2013, as a starter.

Loan to Torino 

On 30 January 2014, he moved to Torino on loan, also at the decision of Palermo, who owned half of his player rights. He scored his first goal for Torino on 19 April 2014 in the 34th round away to Lazio (3–3). During the season, Kurtić collected 16 appearances and scored two goals in the league.

On 20 June 2014, his co-ownership agreement between Palermo and Sassuolo was resolved in favour of Sassuolo.

Loan to Fiorentina 

On 1 September 2014, he moved on loan to Fiorentina. He made his debut on 18 September in the UEFA Europa League match against Guingamp, and scored his first goal on 21 September against Atalanta.

Atalanta 
On 25 June 2015, Kurtić was signed by Atalanta.

Parma 
On 10 January 2020, Kurtić joined Parma on loan until the end of the 2019–20 season, at the end of which Parma was obligated to buy his rights. He signed a contract with the club until 30 June 2023.

Loan to PAOK 
On 18 July 2021, Kurtić joined Super League Greece club PAOK on a two-year loan contract. On 23 January 2022, he became the second PAOK player, after Stavros Sarafis in 1972–73, to score in six consecutive league games.

International career 
Kurtić was a member of the Slovenia under-21 team, appearing in two friendlies in 2009. He made his senior debut against Greece on 26 May 2012, scoring a goal from a free kick.

Career statistics

Club

International 

Scores and results list Slovenia's goal tally first, score column indicates score after each Kurtić goal.

References

External links 

Player profile at NZS 

1989 births
Living people
People from Črnomelj
Slovenian footballers
Association football midfielders
Slovenian expatriate footballers
Slovenia youth international footballers
Slovenia under-21 international footballers
Slovenia international footballers
NK Bela Krajina players
ND Gorica players
Palermo F.C. players
S.S.D. Varese Calcio players
U.S. Sassuolo Calcio players
Torino F.C. players
ACF Fiorentina players
Atalanta B.C. players
S.P.A.L. players
Parma Calcio 1913 players
PAOK FC players
Slovenian Second League players
Slovenian PrvaLiga players
Serie A players
Serie B players
Super League Greece players
Slovenian expatriate sportspeople in Italy
Expatriate footballers in Italy
Slovenian expatriate sportspeople in Greece
Expatriate footballers in Greece